Mujahida Hussain Bibi usually known as Bibi Sahiba or Shaheeda Mai Hussain Bibi registered as a regular soldier in the Pakistan Army, fighting in the 1947 war which was fought against India in Kashmir. Bibi Sahiba received Pakistan's  third highest award for valor, the Sitara-e-Jurat, becoming the first female recipient of the award.

Background
Bibi Sahiba came from a  Rajput  family (Mangral Rajpoot), growing up in Thorar, District Poonch, Rawalkot (Azad Kashmir). She joined  the Pakistan Army, registering as a soldier in the 5th Battalion of the Azad Kashmir Regular Force, commanded by Captain Sher Khan in the Himalayan foothills.

Death
Hari Singh, was reigning as the Maharaja of Jammu and Kashmir, and had his state forces stationed in all over his state including in Poonch region. In October 1947, after the Partition of India, tribal invaders-backed by Pakistan attacked & sponsored the 1947 Poonch Rebellion, subsequently leading to the Indo-Pakistani War of 1947. Bibi Sahiba was a part of the charging group (5 AKRF) during fighting around the Chirikot-Degear defile. She fought bravely, supplying ammunition to Pakistani soldiers fighting in the region. While undertaking this duty, she received a bullet wound and subsequently died at 0500 hours on October 7, 1947.

Awards and decorations
Mujahida Hussain Bibi was awarded Pakistan's third highest military award (Sitara-e-Jurat) for her exemplary courage and bravery.

References 

1947 deaths
Recipients of Sitara-e-Jurat